Sewell Park is a triangular park between Constitution Hill and St. Clement's Hill in Norwich, Norfolk, England. The park was given to the Norwich Corporation and Norwich City Council as an open space by members of the Sewell family and former mayor E. G Buxton in 1908. The park was formally opened on July 5, 1909.

At the entrance to the park is a commemorative horse trough in honour of Anna Sewell,  the author of Black Beauty, and other members of the Sewell family.

Facilities in the park include an open green space and a designated play area for children. The park contains specimen trees including several London Planes.
From the top of the park, the steeples of Norwich Cathedral, St John the Baptist Cathedral, Norwich, St. Peter Mancroft and the clock-tower of Norwich City Hall can be seen.

Adjacent to the park is Sewell Park Academy, where the Sewell Barn Theatre is in the school grounds. There is another entrance to the park opposite Sewell Road.

Centenary
The park celebrated its centenary on Sunday July 6, 2008. The event will involve members of the community and local schools.

Gallery

References

External links
 Sewell Park College Website
 Sewell Park
 Sewell Park centenary celebrations-News report

Parks and open spaces in Norwich